Sajmir Patushi (born 28 September 1976) is an Albanian retired football player. The left midfielder last played for FC Kamza.

Club career
In 2009 he signed a one year-contract with Tirana.

References

External links
 Profile at Playerhistory.

1976 births
Living people
People from Mat (municipality)
Association football midfielders
Albanian footballers
Albania youth international footballers
KS Kastrioti players
FK Partizani Tirana players
KS Burreli players
KF Bylis Ballsh players
HŠK Posušje players
KF Vllaznia Shkodër players
KF Tirana players
KF Elbasani players
KS Shkumbini Peqin players
FC Kamza players
Kategoria Superiore players
Albanian expatriate footballers
Expatriate footballers in Bosnia and Herzegovina
Albanian expatriate sportspeople in Bosnia and Herzegovina